Orthoformic acid or methanetriol is a hypothetical chemical compound with the formula . In this molecule, the central carbon atom is bound to one hydrogen and three hydroxyl groups.

Orthoformic acid has not been isolated to date, and is believed to be unstable, decomposing into water and formic acid.

Esters
Methanetriol esters, known as orthoformates, are well known and commercially available. Like acetals, they are stable towards bases but easily hydrolyzed in acidic conditions to the alcohol and an ester of formic acid. They are used as mild dehydrating agents. Especially well known are trimethyl orthoformate, triethyl orthoformate, and triisopropyl orthoformate.

See also 
 Methanol
 Methanediol
 Orthoacetic acid
 Orthocarbonic acid (methanetetrol)

References

Organic acids
Dehydrating agents
Hypothetical chemical compounds